Marcos Zeida (1 May 1916 – 25 January 2011) was a Paraguayan politician, member of the Paraguayan Communist Party.

Biography
Marcos Zeida was born on May 1, 1916 in Villa Domínguez, Entre Ríos, in Argentina into a Jewish family which fled the pogroms in Russia.

Arrival in Paraguay
In 1924, his family emigrated to Paraguay, settling first in Asunción, and later in Villarrica where Zeida played in the Pettirossi Football Club, and graduated from the Colegio Nacional de Villarrica.

Exile in Uruguay 
In 1947 Zeida went into exile to Uruguay, where he lived almost half his adult life.

References

1916 births
2011 deaths
Argentine people of Russian-Jewish descent
Argentine emigrants to Paraguay
Jewish Argentine politicians
Jewish socialists
People from Entre Ríos Province
People from Villarrica, Paraguay
Paraguayan Communist Party politicians
Paraguayan Jews
Paraguayan people of Russian-Jewish descent
Paraguayan politicians
Paraguayan expatriates in Uruguay